Suardi is a comune (municipality) in the Province of Pavia in the Italian region Lombardy, located about 60 km southwest of Milan and about 35 km southwest of Pavia. As of 31 December 2004, it had a population of 692 and an area of 9.8 km².

Suardi borders the following municipalities: Bassignana, Frascarolo, Gambarana, Valenza.

Demographic evolution

Notable people
 Roberto Casone, footballer

References

Cities and towns in Lombardy